Dhapa may refer to:

 Dhapa, India
 Dhapa, Nepal